Open Land is an album by the jazz guitarist John Abercrombie, with trumpeter and flugelhornist Kenny Wheeler,  saxophonist Joe Lovano, violinist Mark Feldman, organist Dan Wall, and drummer Adam Nussbaum. The album was recorded in 1998 and released by ECM in 1999.

Reception
The AllMusic review by Richard S. Ginell called the album "an absorbing set of elegantly textured, poly-styled music laced with his drifting, occasionally jagged yet never overbearing guitar". The Penguin Guide to Jazz stated: "Like most current ECM sets, this feels very much like a collaborative project rather than a leader-plus-group; but Abercrombie does seem firmly, quietly in charge here, steering the performances in his distinctive hard to define way".

Track listing

Personnel
 John Abercrombie – guitar
 Kenny Wheeler – trumpet, flugelhorn
 Joe Lovano – tenor saxophone
 Mark Feldman – violin
 Dan Wall – Hammond organ
 Adam Nussbaum – drums

References

ECM Records albums
John Abercrombie (guitarist) albums
1999 albums
Albums produced by Manfred Eicher